An Jang Hyeok (Hangul: 안장혁; born October 8, 1968) is a South Korean voice actor who joined the Munhwa Broadcasting Corporation's voice acting division in 1993.

Roles

Broadcast TV
Geisters (MBC)
Ojamajo Doremi (Korea TV Edition, MBC)
Anpanman (Korea TV Edition, MBC)
Red Baron (Korea TV Edition, MBC)
Slam Dunk (Korea TV Edition, SBS)
Soul Frame LAZENCA (MBC) - Maru
Vectorman: Warriors of the Earth (KBS)
Maroon (Korea TV Edition, MBC)
Beyblade (Korea TV Edition, SBS)
Tommy & Oscar (Korea TV Edition, MBC)
The God of High School (Aniplus) - Gang Man-Suk

Movie dubbing
Crayon Shin Chan (Movie Edition, MBC)

Game
MapleStory - Kyson, Hekaton

See also
 Munhwa Broadcasting Corporation
 MBC Voice Acting Division

References

Homepage
 Daum Cafe Voice Actor An Jang Hyeok Fan Cafe(in Korean)
 MBC Voice Acting Division An Jang Hyeok Blog(in Korean)

Living people
South Korean male voice actors
1968 births